Bissinger is a surname. Notable people with the surname include:

Buzz Bissinger (born 1954), American journalist and author
Florian Bissinger (born 1988), German cyclist
John Bissinger (1879–1941), American gymnast and track and field athlete
Karl Bissinger (1914–2008), American photographer